Dino Bevab (born 13 January 1993) is a Bosnian professional footballer who plays for Austrian Regionalliga club SV Wörgl.

Club career
After spells in Croatia and his homeland, he joined SV Wörgl in July 2019.

Honours

Player

Club
Zagreb
Croatian Second League: 2013–14

References

External links

1993 births
Living people
Footballers from Sarajevo
Association football fullbacks
Bosnia and Herzegovina footballers
Bosnia and Herzegovina youth international footballers
Bosnia and Herzegovina under-21 international footballers
NK Zagreb players
FK Željezničar Sarajevo players
FK Olimpik players
NK Čelik Zenica players
FK Tuzla City players
SV Wörgl players
Croatian Football League players
First Football League (Croatia) players
Premier League of Bosnia and Herzegovina players
Austrian Regionalliga players
Bosnia and Herzegovina expatriate footballers
Expatriate footballers in Croatia
Bosnia and Herzegovina expatriate sportspeople in Croatia
Expatriate footballers in Austria
Bosnia and Herzegovina expatriate sportspeople in Austria